The , sometimes romanized as  or , is a Japanese aerophone, an end-blown bamboo flute, crafted from root sections of bamboo. The bamboo root is cleaned and sanded, resulting in a surface patterned with many small, circular knots where the roots formerly joined the stalk.

 have four holes down the front for fingers and one hole on the back for the thumb of the upper hand.

Older  and  also share this trait, though unlike  they usually have an inlaid blowing edge. This property, along with the unlacquered bore, results in a rough and breathy timbre.

Playing traditional  is generally only attempted by highly skilled  musicians, since the blowing and fingering techniques required for  have to be altered considerably. Since  are not generally tuned to a standard musical scale, they do not commonly accompany other instruments.

The term  was popularized by Watzumi Doso. Traditional  were quite similar, with three primary differences. First, modern  performers such as Doso and Okuda often prefer exceptionally long , while  rarely exceeded 2.1 . Second,  had an inlaid mouthpiece, which protects the blowing edge from taking on excess moisture and rotting out. Like the mouthpiece inlay, this protects the bore from taking on excess moisture and contributes to the flute's longevity.

Lacking  and a mouthpiece inlay,  gradually take on moisture as they are played, making the tone less stable. Though  were not tuned to a precise scale either, they could generally be played together. As their hole positions were either calculated or copied from another , a particular  piece could be played roughly the same way on any .  take even more freedom; some of Watazumi Doso's instruments were literally a piece of bamboo cut down with some holes seemingly randomly bored into it.

Again, since the abolition of the Fuke sect in 1871, modern  have been made in two halves in order to tune them more precisely, but  used for Zen practice have been primarily  since the beginning. The term  encompasses all of these, including , and should not be understood as referring only to the modern, more musical iteration of the instrument.

Famous  players
Watazumi Doso Roshi
Nishimura Koku
Atsuya Okuda

References

External links
Close up of Hotchiku, by Kinya Sogawa
Article detailing differences between hotchiku and shakuhachi, by Tom Deaver
One of several messages in a thread on shakumail, describing the history of the term and concept of hotchiku, contrasted with shakuhachi

Japanese musical instruments
End-blown flutes
Bamboo flutes
Five tone hole wind instruments